Women's music is music by women, for women, and about women. The genre emerged as a musical expression of the second-wave feminist movement as well as the labor, civil rights, and peace movements. The movement (in the USA) was started by lesbian performers such as Cris Williamson, Meg Christian and Margie Adam, African-American musicians including Linda Tillery, Mary Watkins, Gwen Avery and activists such as Bernice Johnson Reagon and her group Sweet Honey in the Rock, and peace activist Holly Near. Women's music also refers to the wider industry of women's music that goes beyond the performing artists to include studio musicians, producers, sound engineers, technicians, cover artists, distributors, promoters, and festival organizers who are also women.

History
Early women's music came in various forms, but each viewed music as something that expresses life. According to Ruth Solie, the origins of feminist music came from religion, where Goddess traditions expressed the inner lives of those who lived. She also stated that this type of music has always been creatively challenging and that the changing cultural standards throughout the years made it difficult to create standards in production. Solie's research found that this early form of music wasn't near the artistic form of some of the more famous musicians, notably Beethoven and Bach,  and that this kind of feministic music was created to please the men and lived up to an entirely different standard of beauty.

1960s and 1970s 
In 1963  Lesley Gore came up with song "You Don't Own Me" expressing threatened emancipation, as the singer tells a lover that s/he does not own her, that they aren't to tell her what to do or what to say, and that they are not to put her on display. The song's lyrics became an inspiration for younger women and are sometimes cited as a factor in the second wave feminist movement.   Lesley Gore was later criticized for the rest of her songs not matching feminist aspirations and expectations.

In the late 1960s and early 1970s in the United States, some people perceived that there were few "positive women's images within popular music" and a "lack of opportunities for female performers". They viewed women as having a disadvantage in the field because of their difference in gender. At the time, major US record labels had only signed a few women's bands, including Fanny, Birtha, The Deadly Nightshade, Goldie and the Gingerbreads and the band that they evolved into, Isis.  In reaction to this perceived lack of inclusion of women in the mainstream, some feminists decided it necessary for women to create a separate space for women to create music.  Lesbian and feminist separatism was then used as a "tactic which focused women's energy and would give an enormous boost to the growth and development of women's music."

Out of the separatist movement came the first distributed examples of music created specifically for lesbians or feminists. In 1972, Maxine Feldman, who had been an "out" (openly gay) performer since 1964, recorded the first overtly lesbian record, "Angry Atthis" (Atthis was a lover of the Ancient Greek poet Sappho). Feldman had been performing the song since 1969, and its lyrics were specific to her feelings and experiences as a lesbian. In the same year the feminist all-woman bands The Chicago Women's Liberation Rock Band and the New Haven Women's Liberation Rock Band released Mountain Moving Day. In 1973, Alix Dobkin, flautist Kay Gardner, and bassist Patches Attom created the group Lavender Jane, and recorded an album entitled Lavender Jane Loves Women, the first full-length album for and by lesbians. These early recordings relied on sales through mail order and in a few lesbian-feminist bookstores, like Lambda Rising in Washington, D.C., as well as promotion by word of mouth. In May 1974, the women who would go on to form the first European women's rock band performed at a women's music festival in Berlin. They formed the German women's rock band Flying Lesbians and released one self-titled album in 1975.

Goldenrod Music Distribution, founded by Terry Grant in 1975, has been credited by Lauron Kehrer as a major influence in the launch of the women's music movement. Kehrer noted that although the organization was founded on the basis of helping women and lesbians, it was unable to work around the contradictions surrounding the company's ethics and place in a capitalist society.

Lesbians additionally found ways to express themselves through musical composition. There are common European classical semiotic codes that have been used throughout centuries to express either masculinity or femininity. These musical gestures changed over time as the meaning of femininity changed, but they always kept to their purpose: truthful expressionism. Ethel Smyth, a composer, encoded her lesbian life experiences in her music. Genders of composers, writers, artists, and more have a lot to do with how music is perceived and interpreted. Cues such as tempo, articulation, and other dynamics signify many different types of meanings – they are not standard. Each musician uses these codes and cues to suit their music, and thus express themselves through song.

Feminist musicians aimed to show a positive, proactive, and assertive image of women that not only critiqued the rifts in regards to gender, but also demonstrated the goals of the feminist movement such as social justices regarding gender as well as the right of privacy concerning abortion and birth control.  With the goal of breaking down the gender divide and level the gender differences, some women in this genre of music "adopt[ed] male dress codes and hair styles".  Women also voiced their opinions and the goals of the feminist movement through lyrical contributions.  In "I Am Woman," Helen Reddy sings, "I am woman/hear me roar/And I've been down there on the floor/No one's ever gonna keep me down again. Reddy creates a feeling of "girl power" that reflected the ambitions of the feminist movement.

Record labels, distributors, and publications
Olivia Records, the first women's music record label, was created in 1973 by a collective including artist Meg Christian.  Starting with a single that was successfully sold by mail order, Olivia was able to release Meg Christian's I Know You Know and Cris Williamson's The Changer and the Changed.  The Changer and the Changed was "one of the all-time best selling albums on any independent label" at that time, and was also the first LP to be entirely produced by women. "Changer" is the all-time best-selling album to come out of the women's music genre.

Several other independent labels were created by artists such as Kay Gardner with the record label Wise Woman/Urana, Margie Adam with the record label Pleiades, Ani DiFranco with the record label Righteous Babe Records, and Holly Near with the record label Redwood Records in 1972.  Redwood records expanded the scope of women's music recordings to include women of color by recording Sweet Honey in the Rock, an a cappella group of African-American singers founded by Bernice Reagon in 1978. As these record labels grew so did the music genres represented, and the ethnic and social diversity of the artists expanded. Several other labels were also formed by artists; Berkeley Women's Music Collective, Woody Simmons, and Teresa Trull were distributed by Olivia through their network.

With the growth of independent record labels and increasing demand for women's music, an organized system for distribution and promotion became necessary.  Goldenrod Music was formed in 1975 to distribute for Olivia Records, and later expanded distribution to include other labels. Ladyslipper, a non-profit organization formed in 1976 to promote and distribute women's music. Olivia's informal network formed WILD (Women's Independent Labels Distributors) in 1977 to distribute music into different regions of the United States.  The organization had two purposes - to formally network and educate distributors on sales and business issues, and to bargain with Olivia while Olivia's financial pressures in turn pressured the distributors. In 1978, a national booking company, Roadwork Inc. was formed to promote women artists.

All throughout the 1980s and 1990s, many women's bookstores that sold women's records relocated into smaller spaces or shut down. As a result, Olivia Records spread out to different industries to help its music projects become more profitable. With this expansion Olivia Records entered the travel industry, and Olivia Cruises and Resorts was founded in 1990. However, even with this expansion, sales in women's music continued to decline dramatically.

There were many social and economic components that caused the women's music business to start failing in the 1980s and 1990s. In order to solve these different issues, the MIC (Music Industry Conference) came together to figure out what could be done. For an entire week around 80 women in the music business discussed the prevalent questions/concerns that were affecting women's music at that time. The main topics at the conference were the drop in concert sizes, the unreal pay demands by the female performers, the lack of diversity in women artists, and how Olivia Records, which was initially intended to be a female ran company, was giving high positions to men.

HOT WIRE: The Journal of Women's Music and Culture 
HOT WIRE: The Journal of Women's Music and Culture was a women's music magazine published three times a year from 1984–1994. It was founded in Chicago by volunteers Toni Armstrong Jr., Michele Gautreaux, Ann Morris and Yvonne Zipter; Armstrong Jr. became the sole publisher in 1985. Tracy Baim of Windy City Times called HOT WIRE "the national voice of the burgeoning women's music movement and a wide-ranging chronicle of lesbian feminist culture." The magazine was a separatist publication and named after Zipter's erotic poem "Finding the Hot Wire". The publication focused exclusively on lesbian feminist musicians, festivals, venues, and various topics pertaining to writing, theater, dance, comedy, and the arts. Each 64-page issue included a soundsheet with at least four songs by lesbian and/or feminist artists.

Women's music festivals
The first women's music festival occurred in 1973 at Sacramento State University. In May, 1974 the first National Women's Music Festival was held in Champaign-Urbana, Illinois, founded by University of Illinois student Kristin Lems. It celebrated its fortieth year in Middleton, Wisconsin, from July 2–5, 2015. The Michigan Womyn's Music Festival was created in 1976, and became the largest festival in the United States before ceasing operations after the fortieth festival in August 2015. Newer festivals include Lilith Fair which toured from 1997–1999 and the Ohio Lesbian Festival, near Columbus Ohio, was created in 1988 and continues to be an ongoing celebration of womyn's music and culture. Many other festivals have been created throughout the United States and Canada since the mid-1970s and vary in size from a few hundred to thousands of attendees. The newest festival is the Los Angeles Women's Music Festival, which kicked off in 2007 with over 2,500 attendees, and which was originally scheduled to return in 2009, but has been on indefinite hiatus after the first event.

Though the festivals are centered on music, they support many other facets of lesbian and feminist culture. Designed to provide a safe space for women's music and culture, many festivals are held on college campuses or in remote rural locations. Many festivals offer workshops on topics concerning the lesbian and feminist community, offer activities such as arts, crafts, fitness classes, and athletic events, and serve to provide opportunities for women to take advantage of resources they often cannot find in mainstream culture. One festival that provides such workshops is the National Women's Music Festival. In 1992, the festival provided workshops covering topics such as “drama”,” film and video,” “access-abilities,” “women’s health/sports and fitness,” “older women,” spirituality,” “women’s empowerment,” “women of color, and a writer's conference in addition to other topics in a "general workshop series."

Bonnie Morris describes in her book Eden Built by Eves, how festivals serve women throughout the stages of their lives.  Festivals support a safe space for coming of age rituals for young women, adult romance and commitment ceremonies, the expression of alternative perspectives on motherhood, and the expression of grief and loss.  The Michigan Womyn's Music festival is an example of an environment that celebrates all women not just those who conform to mainstream media. Morris describes attendees at the festival as "women who are sexy in wheelchairs, women who are sexy at 260 pounds, women who are sexy at age 70, long-term interracial romances - and all the rest of womenkind that television will not show or will tell us does not count."  Festivals also help create a sense of community for the lesbian community. The National Women's Music Festival has in addition to the many lesbian participants and organizers, the festival's music, humor, and crafts promote a "positive lesbian identity." The festival has also been a place where women can openly display their sexuality including same-sex affections.

Currently, festivals continue to thrive in the United States and other countries.

See also
 Ladyfest
 Riot Grrl
 Radical Harmonies (2002 documentary about the history of women's music)
 Women in music
 Ruth Dworin, feminist music promoter and concert organizer

References

Citations

Sources

External links
The National Women's Music Festival official site
The Ohio Lesbian Festival official site
Goldenrod Music official site
Roadwork Archives Online
UK and Irish women's music archive

 
Political music genres
Women in music
Music genres
Women in society
Lesbian culture
Songs with feminist themes